Banchory-Devenick is a village approximately two kilometres south of the city of Aberdeen, Scotland in the Lower Deeside area of Aberdeenshire.  The village should not be confused with the historic civil parish of the same name which spanned the River Dee until 1891, its northern part lying in Aberdeenshire and its southern part in Kincardineshire. In that year the northern part became part of the neighbouring parish of Peterculter,  the southern part (including the village) remaining as the parish of Banchory-Devenick. The village of Banchory-Devenick is on the B9077 road, and the ancient Causey Mounth passes directly through the village.  An historic graveyard dating to 1157 AD is present at the village of Banchory-Devenick.  Other historic features in the vicinity include Saint Ternan's Church, Muchalls Castle and the Lairhillock Inn.

History
Banchory-Devenick is located along the Causey Mounth trackway, which road was constructed on high ground to make passable this only available medieval route from coastal points south from Stonehaven to Aberdeen. This ancient passage specifically connected the River Dee crossing (where the present Bridge of Dee is situated) via Portlethen Moss, Muchalls Castle and Stonehaven to the south.  The route was that taken by William Keith, 7th Earl Marischal and the Duke of Montrose when they led a Covenanter army of 9000 men in the first battle of the English Civil War in 1639.

See also
Burn of Elsick
Hare Moss
Portlethen Moss
Alexander Thomson of Banchory FRSE (1798–1868) landowner, author, traveller, philanthropist

Line note references

Villages in Aberdeenshire